Viviane Araújo Gomes (born November 21, 1986) is a Brazilian mixed martial artist. She is a former Pancrase strawweight champion and currently competes in the flyweight division of the Ultimate Fighting Championship (UFC). As of March 7, 2023, she is #10 in the UFC women's flyweight rankings.

Background 
Araújo started playing soccer and spent much of her time away from home to forget about problems at home after witnessing her alcoholic father beating her mother on a daily basis. She later started Brazilian jiu-jitsu and fell in love with the sport after an invitation from her jiu-jitsu coach. She later became a jiu-jitsu teacher and transitioned to mixed martial arts as she was tired of watching her father abuse her mother. Araújo uses the octagon as the platform to voice her support to reach victims of domestic violence.

Mixed martial arts career

Early career
Araújo fought most of her early mixed martial arts career primarily in Brazil and Japan, notably under Jungle Fight and Pancrase where she was the Strawweight Queen of Pancrase prior being signed by the UFC.

Ultimate Fighting Championship
Araújo made her UFC debut and faced Talita Bernardo, replacing Melissa Gatto, on May 11, 2019 at UFC 237. She won the fight via knockout in the third round.

Her second fight came on July 27, 2019 at UFC 240, against Alexis Davis. She won the fight via unanimous decision.

Araújo faced Jessica Eye on December 14, 2019 at UFC 245 
At the weigh-ins, Jessica Eye weighed 131 lbs., five lbs. over the Flyweight limit of 126 lbs. She forfeited 30% of her fight purse to Araújo. She lost the fight via unanimous decision.

Araújo was scheduled to meet Jennifer Maia on June 27, 2020 at UFC on ESPN 11. However, the bout was rescheduled in mid-June to take place on August 1, 2020 at UFC Fight Night: Holm vs. Aldana after both participants faced travel restrictions related to the COVID-19 pandemic. Subsequently, Araújo was removed from the card in mid-July after testing positive for COVID-19 and replaced by Joanne Calderwood.

Araújo faced Montana De La Rosa on September 5, 2020 at UFC Fight Night 176. She won the fight via unanimous decision.

Araújo was briefly scheduled to face Roxanne Modafferi on January 30, 2021 at UFC on ESPN 20. However, the fight was rescheduled and took place 10 days earlier at UFC Fight Night 185 instead. She won the fight via unanimous decision.

Araújo faced Katlyn Chookagian on May 15, 2021 at UFC 262. She lost the bout via unanimous decision.

Araújo was expected to face Alexa Grasso on January 22, 2022 at UFC 270. However, Araújo was forced to pull out form the event due to injury, and the bout was cancelled.

Araújo faced Andrea Lee on May 14, 2022 at UFC on ESPN 36. Despite surviving an early knockdown, Araújo won the bout via unanimous decision.

Araújo was rescheduled  to face Alexa Grasso on August 13, 2022 at UFC on ESPN 41. However, the bout was cancelled due to Grasso's visa issues. The pair was yet again rescheduled on October 15, 2022 at UFC Fight Night 212. Araújo lost the fight via unanimous decision.

Araújo faced Amanda Ribas on March 4, 2023, at UFC 285. She lost the fight via unanimous decision.

Championships and accomplishments

Mixed martial arts
Pancrase
Strawweight Queen of Pancrase (One time)

Mixed martial arts record

|-
|Loss
|align=center|11–5
|Amanda Ribas
|Decision (unanimous)
|UFC 285
|
|align=center|3
|align=center|5:00
|Las Vegas, Nevada, United States
|
|-
|Loss
|align=center|11–4
|Alexa Grasso
|Decision (unanimous)
|UFC Fight Night: Grasso vs. Araújo
|
|align=center|5
|align=center|5:00
|Las Vegas, Nevada, United States
|
|-
|Win
|align=center|11–3
|Andrea Lee 
|Decision (unanimous)
|UFC on ESPN: Błachowicz vs. Rakić 
| 
|align=center|3
|align=center|5:00
|Las Vegas, Nevada, United States
|
|-
|Loss
|align=center|10–3
|Katlyn Chookagian
|Decision (unanimous)
|UFC 262
|
|align=center|3
|align=center|5:00
|Houston, Texas, United States
|
|-
|Win
|align=center|10–2
|Roxanne Modafferi
|Decision (unanimous)
|UFC on ESPN: Chiesa vs. Magny
|
|align=center|3
|align=center|5:00
|Abu Dhabi, United Arab Emirates
|
|-
|Win
|align=center|9–2
|Montana De La Rosa
|Decision (unanimous)
|UFC Fight Night: Overeem vs. Sakai
|
|align=center|3
|align=center|5:00
|Las Vegas, Nevada, United States
|
|-
|Loss
|align=center| 8–2
|Jessica Eye
|Decision (unanimous)
|UFC 245 
|
|align=center|3
|align=center|5:00
|Las Vegas, Nevada, United States
|
|-
|Win
|align=center| 8–1
|Alexis Davis
|Decision (unanimous)
|UFC 240
|
|align=center| 3
|align=center| 5:00
|Edmonton, Alberta, Canada
|
|-
|Win
|align=center| 7–1
|Talita Bernardo
|KO (punch)
|UFC 237
|
|align=center| 3
|align=center| 0:48
|Rio de Janeiro, Brazil 
|
|-
|Win
|align=center| 6–1
|Emi Fujino
|TKO (doctor stoppage)
|Pancrase 298
|
|align=center| 3
|align=center| 0:19
|Tokyo, Japan
|
|-
|Win
|align=center| 5–1
|Ayaka Miura
|TKO (eye injury)
|Pancrase 290
|
|align=center| 1
|align=center| 5:00
|Tokyo, Japan
|
|-
|Win
|align=center| 4–1
|Deize Mayelem de Lima Araújo
|Submission (armbar)
|Iron Fight Combat 11
|
|align=center| 1
|align=center| 4:27
|Feira de Santana, Brazil 
|
|-
|Loss
|align=center| 3–1
|Sarah Frota
|TKO (punches)
|NP Fight Brazil 6
|
|align=center| 1
|align=center| 2:11
|Goiânia, Brazil 
|
|-
|Win
|align=center| 3–0
|Elaine Leal
|Submission (armbar)
|Jungle Fight 90
|
|align=center| 3
|align=center| 2:38
|São Paulo, Brazil 
|
|-
|Win
|align=center| 2–0
|Bianca de Araújo Carvalho
|Submission (armbar)
|Federal Gladiators Combat 1
|
|align=center| 1
|align=center| 3:55
|Brasília, Brazil 
|
|-
|Win
|align=center| 1–0
|Ana Karla Morais
|Submission (heel hook)
|Fight K: Águia
|
|align=center| 1
|align=center| 3:35
|Gama, Brazil 
|
|-

See also
 List of current UFC fighters
 List of female mixed martial artists

References

External links
 

1986 births
Living people
Brazilian female mixed martial artists
LGBT mixed martial artists
Sportspeople from Brasília
Flyweight mixed martial artists
Mixed martial artists utilizing Brazilian jiu-jitsu
Mixed martial artists utilizing Luta Livre
Ultimate Fighting Championship female fighters
Brazilian practitioners of Brazilian jiu-jitsu
People awarded a black belt in Brazilian jiu-jitsu
Female Brazilian jiu-jitsu practitioners